Galeton may refer to:

Galeton, Colorado
Galeton, Pennsylvania